Carnot is a large crater in the northern part of the Moon's far side. It intrudes into the southern rim of the huge walled plain Birkhoff. To the west-southwest of Carnot is the crater Paraskevopoulos.

The outer rim of Carnot has a somewhat hexagonal form, particularly in the southern half. The northern rim has an irregular inner wall, while the southern face is terraced and has a sharper outer edge. There is some slumping along the rim edge to the southeast, producing outward bulges in the perimeter. The western inner wall is partly overlaid by three small, cup-shaped craters.

Within the rim, the crater floor is flat and level, at least in comparison to the rugged terrain around the exterior. Just to the southeast of the crater midpoint is a central peak formation. The interior floor is marked by several small and numerous tiny craterlets. The most prominent of the craters on the floor is a small, shallow crater near the southern inner wall.

Satellite craters
By convention these features are identified on lunar maps by placing the letter on the side of the crater midpoint that is closest to Carnot.

References

 
 
 
 
 
 
 
 
 
 
 
 

Impact craters on the Moon